"Make Me Wanna Die" is a song by American rock band the Pretty Reckless from their eponymous debut extended play (2010) and their debut studio album, Light Me Up (2010). The song was written by Taylor Momsen, Ben Phillips, and Kato Khandwala, and produced by the latter. It was released on April 14, 2010, as the lead single from both the EP and the album.

Background and release
"Make Me Wanna Die" was the first song written for Light Me Up. Momsen has described it as a "tragic love song", stating it was "focused on Romeo and Juliet and a passionate love that might've not been appropriate."

Critical reception
Nick Levine of Digital Spy rated "Make Me Wanna Die" four out of five stars, stating the song "is actually a bit of a blast. To be precise, it's a great big slab of angsty grunge-pop with a screechalong chorus, some nice jaggedy guitar riffs and production as glossy/grungey as its singer's peroxide blonde dye job." Chris Roberts of BBC Music felt that the song "packs every emo-romantic cliché into its punchy pat structure".

Music videos
A promotional video for "Make Me Wanna Die", known as the "viral version", was directed by Patrick Dwyer and released on May 11, 2010. The video, shot at the Hotel Chelsea in New York City, features live performance clips and backstage footage of the band.

The official music video, directed by Meiert Avis and Chris LeDoux, was filmed in Brooklyn, New York City, in March 2010. Momsen explained the concept of the video to MTV News, saying, "[T]o try and emulate kind of an epic-y song that's almost like a film, it was a challenge to come up with a treatment. So I guess we sort of decided to make it like a death march. You can't live anymore in this world, and you're on your way to your death, and you're seeing everything you're passing, and stripping yourself of your belongings on your way to your grave." According to Momsen, the video was "held up in legal for a long time because I was 16 when we shot that. We couldn't release it because, yes, I actually got naked." The video was ultimately released on September 15, 2010 to the iTunes Store in the US.

In film and television
The track plays during the end credits of the 2010 film Kick-Ass, and is also included on its soundtrack. In August 2010, the song was used in a trailer for the second season of The Vampire Diaries. "Make Me Wanna Die" was featured in the ninth episode of the fourth season of Gossip Girl, "The Witches of Bushwick", which aired on November 5, 2010. It was playing when Jenny (Momsen's character), while impersonating Serena, pulls the curtain down to reveal Blair and Chuck talking together. The track was also used during the opening segment of the 2011 Victoria's Secret Fashion Show. The song also appeared on the March 30, 2017, episode of Supernatural, titled "Ladies Drink Free".

Track listing
Digital download
"Make Me Wanna Die" – 3:54
"Zombie" – 3:08

Credits and personnel
Credits adapted from the liner notes of Light Me Up.

The Pretty Reckless
 Taylor Momsen – vocals
 Ben Phillips – guitar, backing vocals
 Jamie Perkins – drums

Additional personnel
 Kato Khandwala – production, engineering, mixing, guitar, bass, percussion, programming, string arrangement
 Dave Eggar – cello
 John Dinklage – violin
 John Bender – backing vocals
 Dan Korneff – mix engineering
 Michael "Mitch" Milan – assistant engineering
 Jon Cohan – drum tech

Charts

Certifications

Release history

References

External links
 
 

2010 debut singles
2010 songs
Interscope Records singles
Music videos directed by Meiert Avis
Polydor Records singles
The Pretty Reckless songs
Songs about death
Songs written by Kato Khandwala
Songs written by Taylor Momsen
Torch songs
Works based on Romeo and Juliet